A Rebel in Time (also published as Rebel in Time) is a 1983 science fiction novel by American writer Harry Harrison.

Plot
The book centers around a racist colonel, Wesley McCulloch, and his black pursuer, Troy Harmon. McCulloch and Harmon both originate from the modern era, the book opening with Harmon called in by a special military watchdog organization to investigate why McCulloch has been buying large quantities of gold.

The case worsens when it is discovered that McCulloch has murdered three people to cover his plans. The theft of a World War II–vintage Sten submachine gun and the plans for such also add to the mystery about what McCulloch is up to.

Before long, Harmon comes to the conclusion McCulloch has used a secret experimental time machine to try to change the outcome of the American Civil War, giving victory to the Confederacy through the introduction of the easily  manufactured Sten gun. Harmon determines he must follow McCulloch into the past to bring justice. During the ensuing chase, Harmon discovers first-hand the prejudices of the people at the time.

Reception
Greg Costikyan reviewed A Rebel in Time in Ares Magazine #14 and commented that "A Rebel in Time is an old-fashioned adventure story of the time-travel genre, something which, I trust, will appeal to those interested in history as well as science fiction."

Reviews
Review by Martyn Taylor (1984) in Paperback Inferno, #49

See also

The Guns of the South
American Civil War alternate histories

References

External links
Rebel In Time page on author's website

1983 American novels
1983 science fiction novels
American Civil War alternate histories
Novels about time travel
Novels set during the American Civil War
American alternate history novels
Novels by Harry Harrison
Tor Books books